PhantasmaChronica is the first album by the Austrian single-man metal band Korovakill after it changed its name to Chryst. The album consists of a single song in multiple movements.

Track listing

Personnel
 Chrystof Niederwieser - vocals, guitar, bass, keyboards, drums

External links
 Chryst - official website
 Omniversal Records
 Encyclopaedia Metallum page

2011 albums
Chryst albums
Concept albums